Oxibendazole is a benzimidazole drug that is used to protect against roundworms, strongyles, threadworms, pinworms and lungworm infestations in horses and some domestic pets. It is usually white to yellowish in appearance, and may take the form of a powder, tablet or paste.

Synthesis

4‑Hydroxyacetamide (1) is alkylated with n-propyl bromide in the presence of potassium hydroxide to give the ether (2). Nitration of this product with nitric and sulfuric acids proceeds at the position ortho to the amide group (3), which is then reduced with SnCl2 to yield the phenylenediamine derivative (4). Reaction of that intermediate with S-methyl isothiourea proceeds first by aromatic cyclisation to the guanidine derivative followed by elimination of methyl mercaptan to yield the 2-aminobenzimidazole system (5). Acylation with methyl chloroformate results in the formation of a urethane on the amino group to produce oxibendazole (6).

References

Benzimidazoles
Carbamates
Phenol ethers
Veterinary drugs